Phryganopsis sordida is a moth in the  subfamily Arctiinae. It was described by Felder in 1874. It is found in South Africa.

References

Natural History Museum Lepidoptera generic names catalog

Endemic moths of South Africa
Moths described in 1874
Lithosiini